Senecio pectinatus, commonly known as alpine groundsel, is a species of flowering plant in the aster family. The species occurs in alpine areas of south-eastern Australia in peat-based soils. It has divided leaves forming a basal rosette and produces a single yellow flower head (up to 30 mm diameter) on a stalk up to 20 cm high.

Two varieties are currently recognised:
Senecio pectinatus var. major F.Muell. ex Belcher (Victoria and New South Wales)
Senecio pectinatus DC. var. pectinatus (Victoria and Tasmania) It has small leaves with the tips of the divided segments curving inwards.

A white-flowering variety (Senecio pectinatus var. ochroleucus F.Muell.) was promoted to species status in 2004 as Senecio albogilvus I.Thomps.

References

pectinatus
Asterales of Australia
Flora of New South Wales
Flora of Tasmania
Flora of Victoria (Australia)